The 2013–14 season was the 11th in the history of the Scarlets, one of the four Welsh regional rugby union sides. In this season, they competed in the Pro12 (formerly known as the Magners League), the Heineken Cup and the LV Cup.

Pre-season and friendlies

RaboDirect Pro12

Fixtures

Table

Anglo-Welsh Cup

Fixtures

Table

Heineken Cup

Fixtures

Table

Transfers

In

Out

New development contracts

Statistics
(+ in the Apps column denotes substitute appearance)

Stats accurate as of match played 20 April 2014

References

2013-14
2013–14 Pro12 by team
2013–14 in Welsh rugby union
2013–14 Heineken Cup by team